Waterloo is a municipality in Wallonia, located in the province of Walloon Brabant, Belgium, which in 2011 had a population of 29,706 and an area of . Waterloo lies a short distance south of Brussels, and immediately north-east of the larger town of Braine-l'Alleud. It is the site of the Battle of Waterloo, where the resurgent Napoleon was defeated for the final time in 1815. Waterloo lies immediately south of the official language border between Flanders and Wallonia.

Etymology
From Middle Dutch, composed of water (water, watery) + loo (forest, clearing in a forest, marsh, bog).

History

The name of Waterloo was mentioned for the first time in 1102 designating a small hamlet at the limit of what is today known as the Sonian Forest, along a major road linking Brussels, Genappe and a coal mine to the south. Waterloo was located at the intersection of the main road and a path leading to a small farming settlement in what is now Cense. The crossing can still be found today as the intersection of the Chaussée de Bruxelles with Boulevard de la Cense. Waterloo was a place where travellers and merchants, particularly those carrying coal from the mine to the south, could find rest and protection from bandits.

Waterloo was located in the Duchy of Brabant created in 1183 with Leuven as the capital city. The Duchy of Brabant extended from Luttre to 's-Hertogenbosch in 1477. Brussels became the capital city of the Duchy of Brabant in 1267 and the capital city of the Burgundian Netherlands in 1430.

Waterloo started to develop during the 17th century. A royal chapel was built in 1687 in Petit-Waterloo, and was extended in 1826, becoming the Church of Saint Joseph of Waterloo.

During the late 18th century, whilst the region was under the rule of the Holy Roman Empire, a period of unrest marked the wake of the 1789 French Revolution. Reforms designed to quell those agitating to bring enlightenment ideas to the region were unsuccessful. In 1794, the French invaded, bringing an end to the region's Ancien Régime, encompassing the monasteries, their official record-keeping, and the privileges of the nobility. 

Up until 1796, Waterloo was divided into two parts, Grand-Waterloo and Petit-Waterloo, depending, respectively, of the parishes of Braine-l'Alleud (Bishopric of Namur) and of Sint-Genesius-Rode (Bishopric of Mechelen). A new system based on municipalities was established under French rule. The municipality of Waterloo was created from Petit-Waterloo detached from Sint-Genesius-Rode and three former hamlets (Grand-Waterloo, Joli-Bois, Mont-Saint-Jean) detached from Braine-l’Alleud. 

In 1813, half of the hamlet of Chenois was detached from Braine-l’Alleud and became part of Waterloo. In 1824, Waterloo grew again as the areas Roussart and Sainte-Gertrude from the Sonian Forest became part of the municipality. Waterloo had 1,571 inhabitants in 1801 and 3,202 in 1846.

In 1795, the invaded territories were divided into nine departments. Some municipalities, including Waterloo, became part of the Dyle department, which became the province of Brabant Méridional in 1815 under Dutch rule, following the defeat of Napoleon. Upon Belgian independence in 1830, it became part of the province of Brabant.

In 1977, the second half of the hamlet of Chenois was detached from Braine-l’Alleud and became part of Waterloo together with a part of the hamlet next to the Lion.

In 1995, the province of Brabant was divided to match the limits of the administrative regions of Wallonia, Brussels and Flanders created in 1980. The part in which Waterloo is situated became the province of Walloon Brabant.

Battle of Waterloo

The Battle of Waterloo took place near Waterloo on 18 June 1815 between the First French Empire of Napoleon Bonaparte and the Seventh Coalition (troops from Prussia, the United Kingdom, the Netherlands, Hanover, Brunswick and Nassau), under the main allied commanders, the Duke of Wellington and Field Marshal von Blücher.

Districts in Waterloo

Waterloo is divided into six districts: Faubourg Ouest (north-west of Chaussée de Bruxelles), Faubourg Est (north-east of Chaussée de Bruxelles), Chenois (west of the railway), Centre, Joli-Bois (south of centre) and Mont-St-Jean (north of the Waterloo battle field).

Demographics 

Nearly one-fifth of the current registered population (5,640 inhabitants) is non-Belgian; many such residents work for institutions or companies in Brussels, a political centre of the European Union. These numbers were released by the municipality of Waterloo. The most common non-Belgian nationalities are the following: French (1,237 people), Italian (537), British (503), American (445) and Swedish (425).

It is one of the wealthiest towns in Wallonia.

Economy
Waterloo is home to the European headquarters of Mastercard. There is a Carrefour hypermarket in Mont-Saint-Jean, a Delhaize store, an Ibis Hotel, several BNP Paribas Fortis branches, office parks to the east of the town.

Education
The Argenteuil estate is host to a number of international and local educational establishments, including; the Scandinavian School of Brussels, the European School of Bruxelles-Argenteuil, "Den norske skolen i Brussel", and the Queen Elisabeth Music Chapel.

St. John's International School is also located within the commune.

Notable landmarks

Lion's Mound 

The Lion's Mound is a monument to the casualties of the 1815 Battle of Waterloo, located on the spot where a musket ball hit the shoulder of William II of the Netherlands (the Prince of Orange) and knocked him from his horse during the battle. A statue of a lion, looking towards France, standing upon a stone-block pedestal surmounts the hill. Visitors can climb the 226 steps to the top of the hill for a panoramic vista of the battlefield. 

Other attractions nearby related to the battle are the Battle Panorama Mural, Wellington Museum, and the Roman Catholic Church of St. Joseph, where Wellington is said to have prayed before going into battle and where British and Dutch plaques commemorating the fallen are now to be seen.

Argenteuil estate 
In 1831, approximately 250 hectares of land in the Sonian Forest was acquired by Ferdinand De Meeus, a member of the Belgian nobility, who bestowed the name "Argenteuil" to the estate. The first "Château d'Argenteuil", built in 1835 was destroyed by a fire in 1847, and rebuilt between 1856 and 1858 using a design by Belgian architect, Jean-Pierre Cluysenaar, and extensive landscaping of the surrounding lands by Édouard Keilig. In the 1920s the De Meeûs family incorporated the estate into the "Domaine d'Argenteuil SA", and in 1929 sold 145 hectares of the land to American businessman, William Hallam Tuck. Tuck and his wife, Belgian heiress, Hilda Bunge, commissioned New York architect, William Delano, to design the second major residence on the Argenteuil estate, the "Château Bellevue". Whilst the couple occupied the property, it became known commonly as the "Château Tuck".

Château d'Argenteuil

In 1940, the Château d'Argenteuil, 20 hectares of its surrounding lands and a farm were sold to a community of Carmelite Sisters in exchange for their properties in Uccle, Brussels. However, the château was not suited to their needs, and they moved out in 1947. The Belgian government acquired the Château d'Argenteuil in 1949. The château's bedrooms were refitted for boarders. The Belgian government later used the site for various Belgian state school establishments, building dedicated buildings for classrooms on the grounds of the château. In 1990, the Scandinavian School of Brussels, Queen Astrid School, purchased the Château d'Argenteuil and its grounds, and relocated there in 1992. From September 2016, the European School of Bruxelles-Argenteuil began operating on the same site.

Château Bellevue
In 1949, the Belgian government acquired the Château Bellevue, originally for use by the Belgian national rail company, the SNCB. In 1958 it was used as residence for distinguished visitors to the 1958 World's Fair in Brussels. From 1961  it was the official residence of the Belgian royal family, King Leopold III and his wife Princess Lilian, up until her death in 2003. During discussions on the Treaty establishing a Constitution for Europe there were proposals to turn the château into a residence for the mooted position of the President of the European Union. However, the Belgian government sold the Chateau Bellevue in September 2004.

Dames de Berlaymont
In 1960, Count Ludovic de Meeûs d'Argenteuil sold thirty hectares of the Argenteuil estate to the Dames de Berlaymont, who had to vacate their properties in Brussels following their acquisition by the Belgian state for the purpose of building a headquarters for the European Commission. The nuns established a new convent and boarding school on the site.

Former landmarks

Château Cheval

The Château Cheval stood at the crossing of the main routes between Charleroi and Brussels, and Nivelles and Leuven. It was originally built in 1895 as the home of a French industrialist who had made his fortune in Mont-Saint-Jean, Waterloo following the opening of a chemical fertiliser plant in 1875. The château, with its four towers and ninety-nine windows, was too extravagant for the tastes of its owner, who found himself only able to sleep there once per week. Chelval gave it to his only daughter who occupied it with her husband until his death in 1962. The exorbitant costs associated with running the property led to its demolition in 1966.

Public transport

Waterloo railway station was opened on 1 February 1874, with the simultaneous opening of the railway line between Waterloo and Brussels. An extension of the line southwards to Nivelles, and then Luttre was opened on 1 June 1874, permitting travel onwards to Charleroi, along an existing line opened in 1843. 

Today, Waterloo is served by local passenger trains on the Nivelles to Aalst line, with at least one train in each direction per hour. Non-stopping services between Waterloo and Brussels operate during peak times.

Sport 

Waterloo is home to ASUB Waterloo, one of Belgium's most successful Rugby Union teams.

Waterloo is also home of Watducks Hockey Club, multiple Belgium champions of field hockey and European Champions in 2019 (EHL).

Notable residents 
In September 1959 the Missionary Dominican Sisters of Our Lady of Fichermont, headquartered in Waterloo, became the home of Jeannine Deckers, who took the name Sister Luc-Gabrielle, and who would later become famous as The Singing Nun.

On 2 February 2018, the Belgian commune of Waterloo confirmed that former Catalonia president Carles Puigdemont had rented a villa and planned to establish his official residence there.

International relations

Twin towns — sister cities
Waterloo is twinned with:

References

External links 
 
 
 Waterloo's official Web TV
 Site about the history of Waterloo
 Site about the history of Braine-l'Alleud with a part of it related to Mont-Saint-Jean in Waterloo, First follow "Hier et aujourd'hui", Afterwards follow "Mont-Saint-Jean"

 
Municipalities of Walloon Brabant
Waterloo Battlefield locations